Mohammed Fuad Omar (born 13 March 1989) is a Yemeni football player who plays as a defender.

He made his debut for the Yemeni national football team on December 9, 2012 in a match against Bahrain during the 2012 WAFF Championship.

References

External links 
 

1989 births
Living people
Yemeni footballers
Yemen international footballers
Yemeni expatriate footballers
Yemeni expatriate sportspeople in Bahrain
Yemeni expatriate sportspeople in Qatar
Expatriate footballers in Bahrain
Expatriate footballers in Qatar
2019 AFC Asian Cup players
Yemeni League players
Bahraini Premier League players
Qatar Stars League players
Qatari Second Division players
Al Sha'ab Ibb players
Al-Saqr SC players
Al Hala SC players
Al Ahli SC (Doha) players
Muaither SC players
Association football defenders